"The Myth of the Vaginal Orgasm" is a feminist essay on women's sexuality written by American radical feminist activist Anne Koedt in 1968, and published in 1970. It first appeared in a four-paragraph outline form in the Notes from the Second Year journal published by the New York Radical Women and was partially based on findings from Masters and Johnson's 1966 work Human Sexual Response. It was then distributed as a pamphlet in its full form, including sections on evidence for the clitoral orgasm, female anatomy, and reasons the "myth" of vaginal orgasm is maintained.

Koedt wrote this feminist response during the sexual revolution of the 1960s. The goal of this response is to address both the "myth of the vaginal orgasm", create awareness and education for women and men about female sexual pleasure, and to counter previous thought about the female orgasm. Koedt reflects in her writing, "It was Freud's feelings about women's secondary and inferior relationship to men that formed the basis for his theories on female sexuality. Once having laid down the law about the nature of our sexuality, Freud not so strangely discovered a tremendous problem of frigidity in women. His recommended cure for a woman who was frigid was psychiatric care. She was suffering from failure to mentally adjust to her "natural" role as a woman." Koedt breaks societal barriers of what is considered acceptable to discuss and her article played a vital role in the feminist sexual revolution, and draws on research done by Alfred Kinsey, among others, about human sexuality to support her claims.

References

External links
The Myth of the Vaginal Orgasm digitized by the New England Free Press
The Clitoris - Animated Documentary by Lori-Malépart Traversy (Video), 2016.

Feminism and sexuality
1970 essays
Radical feminist literature
Pamphlets
Women and sexuality
Books about orgasm
Women's health movement